Edina Double Square Historic District is a national historic district located at Edina, Knox County, Missouri.   The district encompasses 37 contributing buildings in the central business district of Edina.  It developed between about 1865 and 1945 and includes representative examples of Italianate and Streamline Moderne style architecture. Notable contributing buildings include the Public Works Administration funded Knox County Courthouse (1934–1935) designed by William B. Ittner, Bishoff Bakery (1891), Northern Hotel (1860s), Ennis House/Northern Hotel (c. 1865), Edina School and Gymnasium (1915–1916), D. H. Mudd Building (c. 1904), Phillip Linville Building (c. 1908, c. 1963), Tobias J. Lycan Building (c. 1891), Jacob Pugh Building (c. 1891), Albert G. Bostick Building (c. 1891), Knox County Savings Bank (c. 1891), Thomas Burk Buildings (c. 1881), Bank of Edina Building (c. 1907), Joseph F. Biggerstaff Buildings (c. 1881), Stablein Building (c. 1870), and Knox County Public Library (c. 1915).

It was listed on the National Register of Historic Places in 1999, with a boundary increase in 2002.

References

Public Works Administration in Missouri
Historic districts on the National Register of Historic Places in Missouri
Italianate architecture in Missouri
Modernist architecture in Missouri
Buildings and structures in Knox County, Missouri
National Register of Historic Places in Knox County, Missouri